Moxley is an unincorporated community in Jefferson County, in the U.S. state of Georgia.

History
A post office called Moxley was established in 1881, and remained in operation until 1914. The community was named after B. J. Moxley, the proprietor of a local gristmill and country store.

References

Unincorporated communities in Jefferson County, Georgia
Unincorporated communities in Georgia (U.S. state)